Lorelei Grace Linklater (born May 29, 1994) is an American actress. She is the oldest daughter of director Richard Linklater.

Acting 
Linklater appears in films Waking Life and Boyhood (both directed by her father), in the latter playing the older sister to Ellar Coltrane's Mason.

Filmography

Accolades

References

External links

1994 births
Living people
21st-century American actresses
American film actresses
American child actresses
People from San Miguel de Allende
Actresses from Guanajuato